The national flag of Spain, as it is defined in the Constitution of 1978, consists of three horizontal stripes: red, yellow and red, the yellow stripe being twice the size of each red stripe.

The origin of the current flag of Spain is the naval ensign of 1785,  under Charles III of Spain. It was chosen by Charles III himself among 12 different flags designed by Antonio Valdés y Bazán (all proposed flags were presented in a drawing which is in the Naval Museum of Madrid). The flag remained marine-focused for much of the next 50 years, flying over coastal fortresses, marine barracks and other naval property. During the Peninsular War the flag could also be found on marine regiments fighting inland. Not until 1820 was the first Spanish land unit (The La Princesa Regiment) provided with one and it was not until 1843 that Queen Isabella II of Spain made the flag official.

Throughout the 19th and 20th centuries, the color scheme of the flag remained intact, with the exception of the Second Republic period (1931–1939); the only changes centered on the coat of arms.

Spanish flag legal frame and specifications
The present laws and regulations on the Spanish flag are:
 Spanish Constitution of 1978, establishing the national flag:

 Act 39/1981, regulating the use of the flag.
 Royal Decree 441/1981, establishing the detailed technical specifications of the colours of the flag.
 Royal Decree 1511/1977, establishing the Regulations on flags, banners and emblems (Reglamento de Banderas y Estandartes, Guiones, Insignias y Distintivos)
  Royal decree of 19 July 1913 (effective 1 January 1913), abolishing the 5-stripe Spanish merchant flag and establishing the plain bi-colour—the national flag without the shield—as the Spanish merchant flag.

Colours
The colours of the flag, as officially defined by the Spanish Royal Decree 441/1981 of 27 February, are:

The nearest Pantone shades are 7628 C (red) and 7406 C (yellow).

Design
The basic design of the current flag of Spain with the coat of arms is specified by rule 3 of the Royal Decree 1511/1977, that states the following:
 If the flag's length is less than normal, the coat of arms is placed at the center of the flag.

Flag protocol
The flag can only be flown horizontally from public buildings, private homes, businesses, ships, town squares, or during official ceremonies. While the flag should be flown from sunrise to sunset, government offices in Spain and abroad must fly the flag on a 24-hour basis (during the night, and in poor light, it must be properly lit). The flags must conform to the legal standards, and cannot be soiled or damaged in any way.

For mourning activities, the flag can be flown in either of the following ways. The first method, commonly known as half-masting, is performed when the flag is hoisted to the top of the flagpole, then lowered to the pole's one-third position. The other method is to attach a black ribbon to a flag that is permanently affixed to a staff. The ribbon itself is ten centimetres wide and it is attached to the mast so that the ends of the ribbon reach the bottom of the flag. During the funeral ceremony, the flag may be used to cover the coffins of government officials, soldiers and persons designated by an act of the President; these flags are later folded and presented to the next of kin before interment.

When flying the Spanish flag with other flags, the following is the correct order of precedence: the national flag, flags of foreign states, the flag of Europe, international NGOs, military and government standards, autonomous communities flags, city flags and any others. When foreign flags are used alongside the Spanish flag, the flags are sorted according to their countries' names alphabetically in the Spanish language. The only exception is when the congress or meeting held in Spain dictates a different language to be used for sorting. The flag of Europe has been hoisted since Spain became a member of the Union. While not mentioned by name in the law, the flag of NATO can be used in Spain, since it belongs to that organization as well.

When unfurled in the presence of other flags, the national flag must not have smaller dimensions and must be situated in a prominent, honorable place, according to the relevant protocol.

Other flags currently in use

Civil authorities
Some high-ranking officials of the Spanish state (i.e., the president, the vice-presidents and the ministers of the government, or the chairmen of the Congress of Deputies and the Senate) are entitled to display a flag representative of their status. It is a square flag of Spain with the Spanish coat of arms centered on the yellow stripe.

Yacht ensign
The Yacht ensign is the flag of Spain charged with the royal crown in blue in the center of the yellow stripe. This flag was first established in 1875 by Royal Decree (decreto real), which provided that the central stripe would display the royal crown (corona real); this flag apparently continued to be used following the creation of the Spanish Republic in 1931, but the royal crown was changed to a blue mural crown or a blue coronet;  the current version—depicting the royal crown in blue—was introduced following the restoration of the monarchy.

Naval jack 
The Spanish naval jack is only hoisted at the prow of all Navy ships when docked or anchored in foreign waters, from sunrise to sunset. In national waters it is hoisted on Sundays, festivities and in presence of a foreign warship as soon as it moors at the dock. The national flag is always hoisted at the stern, when sailing, and from sunrise to sunset, when docked. It is a square flag (ratio 1:1) composed of 4 quarters: The current version of the jack was adopted in the early 1980s.
 First quarter, for Castile: Gules, a tower Or, masoned sable and ajouré azure;
 Second quarter, for León: Argent, a lion rampant gules (differing from the one on the national flag) crowned, langued and armed or;
 Third quarter, for Aragon: Or, four pallets gules;
 Fourth quarter, for Navarre: Gules, a cross, saltire and orle of chains linked together Or, a centre point vert.

Flags for the Armed Forces
The flag used by the Spanish Armed Forces is the same one that is used as the state flag and national ensign. Military units, however, use a less oblong, more square version (full size dimensions ) charged with the name of the unit.

Royal Standards of Spain

The King of Spain uses a flag known as the Royal Standard. The Royal Standard of Spain consists of a crimson square with the Coat of arms of the King in the center. It is usually flown at the King's official residence, the Palacio de la Zarzuela, other Spanish royal sites, displayed on his official car as small flags. It is regulated by clause 2 of Royal Decree 527/2014, 20 June, an amendment to Title II of Spanish Royal Decree 1511/1977 adopting Flags, Standards, Guidons, Insignia and Emblems Regulation.

The Royal Guidon (Guión), the monarch's military personal ensign, is described by Rule 1 of Royal Decree 527/2014, an amendment to Title II, Rule 1 of Spanish Royal Decree 1511/1977. It is nearly identical to the Royal Standard except that the Royal Guidon has a Gold fringe. It is made of silk taffeta. It is the personal command ensign or positional flag of the monarch, and is carried nearby him.

The heir to the crown, the Princess of Asturias, has her own standard and guidon. The Standard of the Princess of Asturias is regulated by Royal Decree 284/2001 that modified the Title II of Spanish Royal Decree 1511/1977. The Standard of the Princess of Asturias consists of a light blue (the colour of the flag of Asturias) square flag with the coat of arms of the Princess of Asturias in the center. The Guidon is identical to the Standard except that the Royal Guidon has a gold fringe. It is made of silk taffeta. It has fallen into disuse because of the Princess's young age.

History

While the concept of a national flag did not exist in the Middle Ages, the symbol of Spain was the Royal Shield. It was frequently made up of other different flags, full of images and symbols that represented all the values that the troops or the King defended.

Standard of the Catholic monarchs

In Spain the medieval kingdoms which merged in the sixteenth century had their own heraldic symbols and their navies used to display their own flags and standards on both the Mediterranean Sea and the Atlantic Ocean, where the Aragonese and Castilian Crowns had their respective areas of influence. The flag of the Crown of Aragon was a yellow flag with four red stripes (an element which is still common in the present flags of the territories that formed the Crown: Aragon, Catalonia, Valencia, the Balearic Islands and Roussillon in France). The Crown of Castile, since the final union between the kingdoms of Castile and León in 1230, used a quartered flag alternating the Castilian (Gules, a tower Or, masoned sable and ajouré azure) and Leonese (Argent, a lion rampant purpure crowned or, langued and armed gules) emblems. Aragonese and Castilian flags and coats of arms merged when the Catholic monarchs created the new symbols of their personal union of the crowns in 1475.

The banner of Castile and León was the first European symbol to arrive in the New World.

Cross of Burgundy

The Cross of Burgundy was introduced to Spain after the marriage of Joanna of Castile to Philip the Handsome, Duke of Burgundy in 1496. The flag was the primary symbol of Philip the Handsome. It introduced into Spanish vexillology a design that although of foreign origin, would become the primary symbol of Spain. The flag was usually embroidered on white or yellow cloth. Since the reign of Charles I of Spain (1516-1556), different Spanish armies have used flags with the Cross of Burgundy on different fields. It was also incorporated in the uniforms of Burgundian archers, and later in the uniforms of the rest of the army. It also appeared on Spanish regimental flags.

Habsburg Spain
When the House of Habsburg took the Spanish throne by mid-16th century each military company had its own flag in which appeared usually the arms of its commander over the Cross of Burgundy. In order to represent the King, they used to have another one, the "Coronela", during the reign of Charles I (Charles V as Holy Roman Emperor) that was made of yellow silk (the imperial color) with the embroidered imperial shield.

When Philip II came to power, he ordered that, in addition to the flags of each company, each Tercio should have another one of yellow color with the Cross of Burgundy in red. The units of Cavalry took the same flags but of smaller size, called Banners.

However, at this time the concept of a national flag as understood nowadays did not exist, and so the true symbol of the nationality was represented by the Royal arms. The use of other flags besides the mentioned ones was frequent, with various images or symbols. Some examples are the flag of Santiago (Saint James the Great), the green one the Emperor took during the conquest of Tunisia or the crimson one used by Hernán Cortés in Mexico.

Philip V and the new Bourbon dynasty

The arms of Bourbon-Anjou were added in 1700 when Philip V became king of Spain. He introduced several changes on the royal arms. The king's new arms were designed by the French heraldists Charles-René d'Hozier and Pierre Clairambault in November 1700. Philip V also changed the philosophy and the design of the flags of Spain. He was the first to give Spain a unified symbol of its own when putting on white fabric the Cross of Burgundy and the Royal coat of arms. It still was not a national flag, but a first "try", in line with similar attempts in other European nations.

The flags were organized in three groups:

 Standard or Royal flag: it continued being of crimson color, with the royal arms embroidered, the Golden Fleece and the collar of the Order of the Holy Spirit.
 Military flag: the color was reduced to white with the Cross of Burgundy and the Royal arms.
 Pavilion of the Navy: again white, with the Royal arms.

Origins of the present ensign: Charles III

In 1760 Charles III modified the shield of the Royal arms, suppressing the collar of the Holy Spirit, maintained the Golden Fleece and added two new quarters, corresponding to the House of Farnese (six blue lilies on gold) and Medici (five red discs and one blue disc with three lilies of gold, all on gold).

The military flag or Coronela of Spanish regiments was, during the Bourbon years, the Cross of Burgundy with different additions in each military unit depending on their territorial origin, commander, etc.

When Charles III became King of Spain, he observed that most of the countries in Europe used flags which were predominantly white and, since they were frequently at war with each other, lamentable confusions occurred at sea, as if was difficult to determine if a sighted ship were enemy until practically the last moment. For this reason, he ordered his Minister of the Navy to present several models of flags to him, needing to be visible from great distances. The Minister selected twelve sketches which were shown to the king. The flag that was chosen as war ensign is the direct ancestor of the current flag. It was a triband red-yellow-red, of which the yellow band was twice the width of the red bands, a unique feature that distinguished the Spanish tribanded flag from other tribanded European flags. The flag chosen as civil ensign or for Merchant Marine use, meanwhile, consisted of five stripes of yellow-red-yellow-red-yellow, in proportions 1:1:2:1:1. Despite popular belief that the colors which constitute the Spanish flag were derived from the standard of the Crown of Aragon, there is no written evidence to support this.

Second Spanish Republic

On 14 April 1931, the monarchy was overthrown and replaced by the Second Spanish Republic. The regime change was symbolized by a new tricolor flag, red, yellow and murrey, instead of the previous red and yellow bicolor, considered, at the time, monarchist. The purported aim of the murrey strip was to represent Castile and León in the flag's colours, as the existing red and yellow represented the territories of the former Crown of Aragon.
The Republican flag was officially adopted on 27 April and officially given to the army on 6 May. Another novelty was the smaller dimensions of this flag in its military version, of 1 m by 1 m.

As for the addition of the murrey to represent Castile in the national flag, since the last quarter of the 20th century there are authors that contradict former historians maintaining that the Castilian banner was not murrey, but crimson.

Spanish State

The Spanish Civil War officially ended on 1 April 1939, when the last Spanish Republican outposts were overrun by the Nationalists.

On 29 August 1936, the National Defense Junta issued Decree No. 77 that declared: "The red and gold/yellow bicolour flag is re-established as the flag of Spain", which served as the first flag of Nationalist Spain. This flag was replaced in 1938 by a flag bearing the Eagle of Saint John added to the shield. In 1938 the columns were placed outside the wings.

On 26 July 1945, the commander's ensigns were suppressed by decree, and on 11 October a detailed regulation of flags was published, that fixed the model of the bi-colour flag in use, with a new version of the Saint John eagle. The models established on that decree were in force until 1977.

During this period two more flags were usually displayed together with the national flag: the flag of Spanish Falange (three vertical strips, red, black, red, with the black stripe being wider than the red ones, and the yoke and arrows emblem in red placed on the centre of the black stripe) and the Carlist flag (the Saint Andrew saltire or Cross of Burgundy red on white) as representation of the National Movement.

Spanish transition

From the death of Franco in 1975 to 1977, the national flag remained that of the 1945 regulation. On 21 January 1977 a new flag was approved that differed from the previous one in that the eagle's wings opened further (the "pasmada" eagle), the Pillars of Hercules were again placed within the wings, and the ribbon with the motto UNA, GRANDE Y LIBRE (ONE, GREAT and FREE) was moved from the eagle's neck to above the eagle's head. Not many flags with this coat of arms were made. Finally, and after the restoration of the House of Bourbon to the Spanish Throne in the person of King Juan Carlos I, the Spanish Constitution of 1978 was published, article 42 section 12 of which reads "The Flag of Spain is formed by three horizontal stripes, red, yellow and red, the yellow being double the width of each of the red ones."

The national flag of Spain finally received its present-day coat of arms on 19 December 1981.

Unofficial flags

 At some point during the 1990s an unofficial version of the Spanish flag sporting an Osborne bull superimposed as some sort of "coat of arms" began appearing in football arenas. This usage has become increasingly popular and this flag is easily seen nowadays during sports events, football or others, which include a Spanish team or player, or the Spanish national team itself.
 The flag of the Second Republic, with the indigo strip, is often seen in rallies organized by those closely associated to the Second Spanish Republic. The flag is mostly used by left-leaning people to show a disdain for the monarchy. .
 A Spanish flag with a superimposed kicked football was used as the emblem of the 1982 FIFA World Cup.
 The yellow and red colours used on the "pecten" logo of Royal Dutch Shell are thought to relate to the colours of the flag of Spain, as Shell built early service stations in the state of California which had strong connections with Spain.
 The Spanish flag is used in the reverse of the Texas state seal as one of the six flags over Texas, as well as in the seal of the city of Mobile, Alabama.
 A new Iberian union is a political prospect proposed by Iberism thinkers in which Portugal and Spain would be united. There are several flag options most of them combining both countries' colours and coats of arms.

See also

 List of proposed Spanish flags
 List of Spanish flags
 Spanish fess

Note

References

External links

 
 The Spanish Flag, colors, history, symbolism. 
 Flag of Spain – Royal Spanish Navy
 Historical Flag of Spain
 Presidency of the Government – The Banner
  

National symbols of Spain
 
Spain
Spain
Spain
Spain